Marcelo Gil (born 25 May 1965) is an Argentine sports shooter. He competed in the men's skeet event at the 1996 Summer Olympics.

References

External links
 

1965 births
Living people
Argentine male sport shooters
Olympic shooters of Argentina
Shooters at the 1996 Summer Olympics
Place of birth missing (living people)